Code42 is an American cybersecurity software company based in Minneapolis specializing in insider risk management. It is the maker of the cloud-native data protection products Incydr and CrashPlan. Code42’s Incydr is a SaaS data-loss protection product. Incydr is designed to help enterprise security teams detect insider risks to data that could lead to data leak and data loss and insider threat breaches, and respond to them appropriately. Code42’s CrashPlan for Small Business is cloud data backup and recovery software.

History
Code42 was founded as an IT consulting company in 2001, by Matthew Dornquast, Brian Bispala, and Mitch Coopet. The company's name honors Douglas Adams, who authored Hitchhiker’s Guide to the Galaxy and had died that year. In the book, the number 42 is the "answer to the ultimate question of life, the universe and everything".
 
Some of Code42's first projects included a redesign of Sun Country Airlines’ website in 2002, a project for the retailer Target Corporation, and the ticket booking engine for Midwest Airlines. Income from the IT services business was used to fund product ideas for six years.
 
In 2006, the company planned to create a Facebook-like desktop application, but the project became too large and impractical. Code42 focused on the online storage element of the application, creating CrashPlan in 2007.
 
In June 2011, Code42 acquired a Minneapolis-based mobile development company, Recursive Awesome LLC, to support its software on mobile devices.
 
In 2012, Code42 raised $52.5 million in funding. The funding was the first distribution from a $100 million pool established in 2011 by Accel Partners to fund Big Data companies.
 
In mid 2015, former Eloqua CEO Joe Payne succeeded co-founder Matthew Dornquast as CEO. The company raised an additional $85 million in funding in October 2015.
 
On August 22, 2017, Code42 announced they were shutting down CrashPlan for Home, effective in October 2018. They were not accepting new subscriptions but would maintain existing subscriptions until the end of their existing subscription period, at which point the backups would be purged. The Home plans had been replaced by CrashPlan for Small Business, which are business-focused, although still possible to use for private purposes. Backups to friends/family are not supported in the new product, the company explained: "As we shift our business strategy to focus exclusively on enterprise and small business segments, you have two great options to continue getting the best backup solution.".
 
In September 2020, Code42 launched its Incydr data risk detection and response product, a SaaS data protection tool for enterprises. Incydr allows security teams to effectively mitigate file exposure and exfiltration risks without disrupting legitimate work and collaboration. Incydr guards intellectual property, source code and trade secrets. Incydr is Code42’s flagship product.
 
Also in September 2020, Code42 leaders Joe Payne, Jadee Hanson, and Mark Wojtasiak, co-authored and published the book Inside Jobs: Why Insider Risk is the Biggest Cyber Threat You Can’t Ignore. The book explores the problem of insider risk, what drives it, why they believe traditional methods of protecting company data are inadequate and what security leaders can do to keep their data secure.

Business
 
As of April 2011, 80% of Code42 Software’s revenue comes from business customers. Most of the remainder comes from consumers and a small portion from service provider partners. It was reported in 2012 that Code42 had been profitable each year since it was founded. It grew from $1.4 million in revenue in 2008 to $11.46 million in 2010 and $18.5 million in 2011. In 2020, Code42's SaaS business was $100 million annually. As of 2012, the company had backed up 100 petabytes of data and processed 100 billion files a day.

Products and services
Code42 is the maker of the Incydr data loss detection and response product. It allows security teams to mitigate file exposure and exfiltration risks without disrupting collaboration. Incydr comes in two plans: Basic and Advanced.
 
Incydr displays information about what data is relevant, including how, when and where that data is moving, and who is moving it. It monitors the creation, deletion, modification and movement of all files, whether the activity is within a company’s security protocols or not. Even though Incydr monitors all file activity, it distinguishes between acceptable team collaboration and file sharing and events that represent risks to businesses.
 
Code42 also is the maker of cloud backup and recovery software CrashPlan for Small Business. CrashPlan backs up data to remote servers or hard drives. It is available on Mac, Windows and Linux. As of 2018, backup to other computers is no longer supported.
 
Initial backups may take several hours via LAN or days over the internet, depending on the amount of data and bandwidth available, but afterwards, continuous and incremental backups are conducted without user intervention.
 
Around 2012, there used to be a paid option for seed loading, in which a hard drive was sent to the user, so a faster local backup could be performed to the drive and it could be shipped back to Code42 for initial backup.  However this Seeded Backup service was no longer offered in 2016; neither was the corresponding Restore-to-Door service, which would allow a hard drive containing extensive restore data from backups to be shipped back to the user faster than an over-the-Internet download.
 
With CrashPlan, Data is encrypted, password-protected and stored in a proprietary format. There is also an option for a more secure private key. Corporate users in 2012 that had CrashPlan PROe back up to private servers instead of Code42's data centers in four out of five cases. In 2012, the software had an option to create a private on-site backup server.
 
In 2013, Code42 developed, released and marketed a file sharing service called SharePlan. According to the Star Tribune, it competed with DropBox, but SharePlan used a PIN  to access files and track users.
 
In October 2014, a revision of the software added features for regulatory compliance like Sarbanes-Oxley and options for a private, public or hybrid cloud deployment. It had a single login with Crashplan using a feature called the "Code42 EDGE Platform", which was improved in December 2014 with two-factor authentication features. Shareplan was discontinued in August 2015.
 
In a comparative review published in  2015 in The Wall Street Journal, Geoffrey Fowler observed CrashPlan was his favorite out of the four services evaluated. He observed it lacked "fine print", whereas some of the other services charged additional fees for basic features or weren't really unlimited. PC Magazine in 2017 gave CrashPlan 4.5 out of 5 stars and awarded it Editor's Choice. The review praised it for its user interface, local backup options, and security features, but said its mobile and explorer-based features were "limited."
 
A 2012 product review on MacWorld gave CrashPlan a rating of 4.5 out of 5, and Gartner, in 2012, gave the enterprise version, CrashPlan PROe, an "excellent" rating. All Things Digital praised CrashPlan for its operating system support and configuration options. Also in 2012, Ars Technica said CrashPlan had better features and pricing options than its competitors.

See also

 Comparison of online backup services

References

External links
 
 Crashplan website
 

Companies based in Minneapolis
Software companies based in Minneapolis
Software companies based in Minnesota
Backup software
Web hosting
Classic Mac OS software
File hosting for Linux
File hosting for macOS
File hosting for Windows
Software companies of the United States